Khomir Kandeh (also Romanized as Khomīr Kandeh) is a village in Nowkand Kola Rural District, in the Central District of Qaem Shahr County, Mazandaran Province, Iran. At the 2006 census, its population was 161, in 45 families.

References 

Populated places in Qaem Shahr County